Vincenzo Civerchio or Civercio (c. 1470c. 1544) was an Italian painter of the Renaissance, born at Crema, and active also in Brescia, where there are some of his alter-pieces. One of his works is at the National Gallery of Art, Washington D.C., others in the Pinacoteca di Brera, Milan, Italy. He is said to be an imitator of Bernardino Butinone, Bernardino Zenale, and influenced by Vincenzo Foppa.

Luigi Donato of Como is said to have been a pupil.

See also
 Bartolomeo di Cassino

External links
 Pinacoteca di Brera
 Pacioli.net

References

15th-century Italian painters
Italian male painters
16th-century Italian painters
Renaissance painters
Painters from Brescia
1470 births
1544 deaths